The DR Congo national basketball team (French: Équipe nationale de basketball de Congo DR) represents DR Congo in men's international basketball competitions, it is controlled by the Basketball Federation of Democratic Republic of Congo.

The team has appeared in the FIBA Africa Championship, but has yet to appear in the FIBA World Championship. Its biggest success to date was the Final Four placement at the 1975 FIBA Africa Championship when it competed as Zaire.

History 
DR Congo joined the FIBA in 1963 and made their first tournament debut twelve years later, during the 1974 AfroBasket. In the following year, they played in the 1975 AfroBasket championship. Congo ended in the fourth place after a 2–3 record. After a 6th place in 1980, the team missed the tournament for the next 27 years.

During AfroBasket 2007, DR Congo returned and finished 15th.

After another 10-year absence, the country played in the AfroBasket 2017 where they reached the quarter-finals after upsetting Nigeria in the group phase.

In August 2022, Jonathan Kuminga joined the Congolese team to become the first National Basketball Association (NBA) player to play for the national team. Kuminga had just won his first NBA championship with the Golden State Warriors.

Performances

FIBA Basketball World Cup 
DR Congo has never appeared in the FIBA Basketball World Cup, but has played in the qualifying rounds.

AfroBasket
 Fourth place

FIBA AfroCan

 Champions

Team

Current roster
Roster in the 2023 FIBA World Cup qualifiers of August 27, 2022.

Head coaches

Notable eligible players

Top scorers 
The following players were the DR Congo's top scorers in their AfroBasket tournaments:

See also
Basketball Federation of the Democratic Republic of the Congo
Dikembe Mutombo
Christian Eyenga
Bismack Biyombo
DR Congo women's national basketball team
DR Congo national under-19 basketball team
DR Congo national under-17 basketball team
DR Congo national 3x3 team

References

External links
FIBA profile
Africabasket – DR Congo Men National Team
DR Congo Basketball Records at FIBA Archive

DR Congo
Basketball
Basketball
1963 establishments in the Republic of the Congo (Léopoldville)